Samaspur is a midsize Yadav dominated Village in the middle of Sector 51 in Gurgaon  in the state of  Haryana, India. It has a population of about 1850 persons living in around 348 households. It is a well planned and the first model village of the country set up by Jawaharlal Nehru and inaugurated by Harold Macmillan (UK Prime Minister). It has wide paved streets laid into rectangular pattern. The houses of the village are airy and have open spaces in front of them. The village has several large developed parks which provide open space for the children to play, elders to walk and women to relax. The village has well laid out sewage and drainage system, there are no open drains in the village.

The Major Caste in the Village is Yadav and in the  Family it is majorly Dominated by the family of Shri Charanji lal who served as a Jamidar in the village their family had the majority of shares of land in the village, they had contributed a lot in the betterment of the village by applying modern methods and techniques.

The First Head of the Village was Prithvi Pal Yadav ( Son of Ram Narain ) who devoted his life in Agriculture, and in the service of the Village people, his family has a major influence in the village . He has three brothers, the elder on is a Renowned Geography Professor

The land of the village was purchased by a private builder, The Mayfield Gardern, and the  rest of it was acquired by HUDA in 1990. On a piece of HUDA land, the Haryana Government have built a commerce and science college which is likely to start functioning from April–May 2016.

The village has a government co-educational middle school and a private school.

Nearby villages

The village Shamaspur is surrounded by Wazirabad in the East (1 km), Kanhai in the North (1 km), Jharsa in the West (1.5 km), Tighra in the South East (0.9 km), Badshapur in the South (2.5 km)

References 

Villages in Gurgaon district